Byron Airport  is a public airport two miles south of Byron, in Contra Costa County, California, United States. The FAA's National Plan of Integrated Airport Systems for 2007–2011 categorized it as a reliever airport.

About
On the lee side of the Diablo Range mountains, Byron experiences 10-30 knot winds and thermals. Local student pilots often use Byron to practice crosswind landings.

Uncontrolled and relatively isolated, Byron supports organizations for skydiving and soaring. For skydiving, the popular drop zone is on the north end of the airport and serviced by Bay Area Skydiving. For soaring, the Northern California Soaring Association offers instructions on weekends in flying gliders.

All pilots should be mindful of the variable wind and thermals, rising terrain, and traffic without radios.

Facilities

In the year ending January 29, 2004 the airport had 60,050 aircraft operations, average 164 per day: 99.9% general aviation and <1% military. 130 aircraft are based at this airport: 69% single-engine, 15% glider, 8% multi-engine, 5% jet and 3% ultralight.

References

External links
Byron Airport at Contra Costa County Airports website
Northern California Soaring Association
Bay Area Skydiving

See also
 List of airports in the San Francisco Bay Area

Airports in Contra Costa County, California